The Canadian Institute for Theoretical Astrophysics (CITA) is a national research institute funded by the Natural Sciences and Engineering Research Council, located at the University of Toronto in Toronto, Ontario, Canada. CITA's mission is "to foster interaction within the Canadian theoretical Astrophysics community and to serve as an international center of excellence for theoretical studies in astrophysics." CITA was incorporated in 1984.

CITA has close administrative and academic relations with the Canadian Institute for Advanced Research (CIFAR); several CITA faculty also serve as members of CIFAR.

History
The concept of a nationally supported institute for theoretical astrophysics dates back to discussions within the Canadian Astronomical Society in the early 1980s. A series of committees advocated a model of a university‑based institute governed by a council of Canadian astrophysicists. Proposals were solicited from universities across the country to host this institute, which by now had been named the Canadian Institute for Theoretical Astrophysics/Institut Canadien d'astrophysique theorique (CITA/ICAT). The University of Toronto won the resulting spirited competition, and CITA (University of Toronto) was established as an institute within the School of Graduate Studies in June 1984, with staff consisting of a single professor (Peter G. Martin) as the acting director and a visiting professor from Queen's University (Richard Henriksen) and a temporary administrative assistant. Today there are 7 faculty members two of which are Canada Research Chairs, two administrative staff, a Systems Manager and technical computing staff.

At the same time, Professor Richard Henriksen worked on establishing CITA, Inc. (a separate entity from CITA the institute at the University of Toronto) as an incorporated national institute and charity governed by an elected Council of Canadian astrophysics/relativity professors to promote research in theoretical astrophysics across the country. CITA Council is selected from CITA Inc members. There are presently 55 members of CITA, Inc.

CITA's research activities are supported by the University of Toronto, NSERC, multiple grants by the Ontario and Federal governments, as well as private sponsors including the Simons Foundation and CIFAR.

Membership
CITA has a small number of long-term faculty members, and a larger number of short term (3- or 5-year) postdoctoral positions, as well as an active visitor program; the purpose of the relatively high influx of new researchers or visitors is to ensure that timely topics are well represented at CITA. There are currently approximately 20 postdoctoral researchers at CITA, and 4 full-time administrative and computer staff. Several graduate students in the University of Toronto Department of Astronomy and Astrophysics or Department of Physics work with CITA researchers throughout their graduate work, and typically ten undergraduates come to CITA to work over the summer.

In 1985, Scott D. Tremaine came to CITA as its first director; Margaret Fukunaga was hired as the permanent Business Officer and Dick Bond arrived as the second faculty member. Dick Bond became the director in 1996 and Norman Murray was director 2006–2016.

Since 1984, the directors of the institute have been as follows:

Notable past and present faculty members of CITA also include:

Peter G. Martin, 1984–present
Scott Tremaine, 1985–1997, 2020–present
Dick Bond, 1985–present
Nick Kaiser, 1988–1997
Norm Murray, 1993–present
Lev Kofman, 1998–2009
Ue-Li Pen, 1998–present
Chris Thompson, 2000–present
Roman Rafikov, 2005–2007
Harald Pfeiffer, 2009–2018
Daniel Green, 2014–2015

Research
CITA has active research programs in cosmology (particularly in studies of the cosmic microwave background), early universe studies and cosmic inflation, neutron stars (especially scintillometry and magnetars), fast radio burst, active galaxies, star formation and planet formation.

See also
Algonquin 46m radio telescope
Algonquin Radio Observatory
Dominion Astrophysical Observatory
Dominion Radio Astrophysical Observatory
Herzberg Institute of Astrophysics

References

J. Richard Bond receives 2008 Gruber Prize in Cosmology

External links
The Canadian Institute for Theoretical Astrophysics
An incomplete listing of recent CITA publications

University of Toronto
Astronomy institutes and departments